The 1955–56 season was the 72nd Scottish football season in which Dumbarton competed at national level, entering the Scottish Football League, the Scottish Cup and the Scottish League Cup.  In addition Dumbarton competed in the Stirlingshire Cup.

Scottish League

The return to the 'top' divisions in Scottish League football was a success in many ways with Dumbarton always challenging the top places in the Second Division throughout the campaign - but eventually had to settle for a 4th place out of 19, only 7 points behind champions Queen's Park (and just 4 short of a promotion place).

Scottish Cup

Dumbarton negotiated a tricky tie against Highland League opposition in the third round of the Cup, before losing out to Dundee United in the next round.

Scottish League Cup

For the first time, Dumbarton qualified from their League Cup section, winning 3 and drawing the other of their 4 matches.  In a play off, Morton were seen off - before Division A St Mirren were to prove to be too much for them in the quarter final.

Stirlingshire Cup
The county cup semi final tie was a thriller, where Dumbarton lost by the odd goal in 11 against A Division opponents Falkirk.

Friendlies

Player statistics

|}

Source:

Transfers
Amongst those players joining and leaving the club were the following:

Players in

Players out 

Source:

Reserve team
Dumbarton only played one official 'reserve' match in the Second XI Cup, losing in the first round to Partick Thistle.

References

Dumbarton F.C. seasons
Scottish football clubs 1955–56 season